William Newland may refer to:

 William C. Newland (1860–1938), Lieutenant Governor of North Carolina
 William D. Newland (1841–1914), United States Navy sailor and Medal of Honor recipient
 William R. Newland (1919–1998), New Zealand-British studio potter 
 William Newland (MP) (c. 1685–1738), British lawyer and politician